William Daniel Barrett (27 October 1878 – 23 May 1953) was a New Zealand tribal leader, land court agent and trust board secretary. Of Māori descent, he identified with the Ngai Tahu (South Island) iwi. He was born in Riverton, Southland, New Zealand on 27 October 1878.

In 1953, he was posthumously awarded the Queen Elizabeth II Coronation Medal.

References

1878 births
1953 deaths
Ngāi Tahu people
New Zealand Māori public servants
People from Riverton, New Zealand
Māori politicians